Eaglesham is a village and parish in Renfrewshire, Scotland.

Eaglesham may also refer to:

People
 Dale Eaglesham (born 1962), Canadian comic book illustrator
 Graeme Eaglesham (born 1989), Scottish footballer
 Hugh Elliott Eaglesham (1873–1938), Canadian politician and physician
 Philip Eaglesham (born 1982), Irish Paralympic shooter and mental health campaigner

Places
 Eaglesham, Alberta, a hamlet in northern Alberta, Canada